Honey Irani is an Indian actress and screenwriter, who works in Hindi cinema. She started her career as a child actor with roles in films such as Mahesh Kaul’s Pyar ki Pyas. She was probably four to five years old when the shooting of the movies Chirag Kahan Roshni Kahan and Bombay Ka Chor started.

Background and personal life
Honey Irani was born on January 17, 1955, and is the youngest of five siblings, the others being Menaka, Bunny, Sarosh, and  Daisy Irani. Irani's oldest sister, Menaka, is married to the stunt film-maker Kamran Khan. Her other sister Daisy, who was also a famous child-star like herself, was married (till his death) to screenwriter K.K. Shukla, and is the mother of three children.

Irani met the script-writer and poet Javed Akhtar on the sets of Seeta Aur Geeta. They were married on 21 March 1972. She is the mother of film-makers Zoya Akther and Farhan Akther. Her eldest child, Zoya, was born on 14 October 1972, making Honey Irani a mother at the young age of 17 years.  
Her career as a child star had already ended and his career as a script-writer had not yet properly begun. They had no place to live, and were given a room in the house of Irani's older married sister Menaka. Their daughter Zoya Akhtar was born in 1972 and their son Farhan Akhtar in the 1974. Irani became a devoted home-maker, but the marriage ended in divorce after her husband became involved with the actress Shabana Azmi in the mid-1970s. The couple separated in 1978 and divorced in 1985. While Akhtar married Shabana Azmi in 1984, Irani devoted herself to the care of her two young children, who were six years and four years old respectively in 1978. She even started doing embroidery on sarees as a way of earning money to support her children. Eventually, she managed to make a second career for herself as a writer of film scripts. Both of Irani's children (son Farhan Akhtar and daughter Zoya Akhtar) grew up to be successful filmmakers in the Hindi film industry.

Career
Honey Irani began her Bollywood career as a child actress with roles in films such as Chirag Kahan Roshni Kahan and Bombay Ka Chor. She has acted in over 72 films.

After her divorce, she started doing embroidery on sarees to support her family. Though she had been writing short stories all this while, she never shared them. She narrated the story idea of Aaina (1993) to Pam Chopra, wife of Yash Chopra for a TV series, but he developed it into a film. Yash Chopra had also previously asked her to develop a story idea, which went on to become her debut as a screenwriter, Lamhe (1991), starring Sridevi. The film saw mediocre success, but she won the Filmfare Award for Best Story for the film and it paved her way for a successful career as screenwriter. Both Aaina and Lamhe strengthen her bond with Yash Chopra who gave her his next film Darr (1993). However she parted ways with Yash Chopra after she was not given credit for her work on Dilwale Dulhania Le Jayenge. She won the award again for Kya Kehna in 2002, besides winning Filmfare Award for Best Screenplay with Ravi Kapoor for the blockbuster Kaho Naa... Pyaar Hai in 2001.

Awards

Partial filmography

Screenwriter

 Krrish 3 (2013)
 Har Pal (2007)
 Krrish (2006), screenplay
 Koi... Mil Gaya (2003), screenplay
 Armaan (2003), screenplay and story
 Albela (2001)
 Kya Kehna (2000)
 Kaho Naa... Pyaar Hai (2000), screenplay
 Laawaris (1999), screenplay and story
 Jab Pyaar Kisise Hota Hai (1998), screenplay and story
 Aur Pyaar Ho Gaya (1997), story
 Suhaag (1994), screenplay
 Darr (1993), screenplay and story
 Aaina (1993), screenplay and story 
 Parampara (1993 film), screenplay and story
 Lamhe (1991), screenplay and story

Actor
 Seeta Aur Geeta (1972), as Sheila
 Amar Prem (1971)
 Kati Patang (1970) as Manorama ("Munni")
 Chandi Ki Deewar (1964)
 Soorat Aur Seerat (1962)
 Amar Rahe Yeh Pyar (1961)
 Chirag Kahan Roshni Kahan (1959)
 Qaidi No. 911 (1959)
 Pyar ki Pyas (1961) as Geeta.
 Zameen Ke Taare (1960).
 Masoom (1960).

Director
 Armaan (2003)

Notes

References

External links
 

Year of birth missing (living people)
21st-century Indian women writers
21st-century Indian dramatists and playwrights
Actresses in Hindi cinema
Filmfare Awards winners
Indian women screenwriters
20th-century Indian women writers
20th-century Indian dramatists and playwrights
Living people
20th-century Indian actresses
Screenwriters from Mumbai
Actresses from Mumbai
Women writers from Maharashtra
Hindi screenwriters
Irani people